The Naughty Kitchen With Chef Blythe Beck is a reality based TV series that aired on Oxygen between September and November 2009.  The show featured Texas native Blythe Beck, who was the new executive chef at Central 214 restaurant inside the Hotel Palomar, a luxury boutique hotel in the heart of Dallas, Texas. The show followed Blythe Beck and her staff inside and outside the kitchen as they interact with the Dallas elite and the locals.

Cast

 Chef Blythe Beck  is the main chef of Central 214.
 Eric (aka Jimmy or Monkey) is the Sous chef of Central 214.
 Megan is the General Manager of Central 214. 
 Kerri is an Event Coordinator of Central 214.  
 Curtis is Central 214's new summer host.
 Emily is another host at Central 214.  
 Calvin is a Central 214  waiter.   
 Robynn is Central 214's cocktail waitress, who has worked at the restaurant for two years.
 Sam is the Cocktail Server/Waiter at Central 214.
 Roy is a Server/Waiter at Central 214.

Episodes

See also
 

2009 American television series debuts
2009 American television series endings
2000s American cooking television series
Food reality television series
Oxygen (TV channel) original programming
Television shows filmed in Texas
Television shows set in Dallas